Antonimina is a comune (municipality) in the Metropolitan City of Reggio Calabria in the Italian region Calabria, located about  southwest of Catanzaro and about  northeast of Reggio Calabria.

Antonimina borders the following municipalities: Ciminà, Cittanova, Gerace, Locri, Portigliola, Sant'Ilario dello Ionio.

References

External links
Antonimina Extractions-

Cities and towns in Calabria